The Ticket-of-Leave Man or The Ticket of Leave Man may refer to:

 The Ticket-of-Leave Man (play), an 1863 play by Tom Taylor
 The Ticket of Leave Man (1912 film), an Australian film directed by Gaston Mervale
 The Ticket-of-Leave Man (1914 film), an American film
 The Ticket-of-Leave Man (1918 film), a British film directed by Bert Haldane
 The Ticket of Leave Man (1937 film), a British film starring Tod Slaughter

See also
 Ticket of Leave